Brenta is a surname. Notable people with the surname include:

 Emilio Brenta, an Italian admiral
 Julie Brenta, a Belgian sound engineer and film editor

See also 

 Brenta (disambiguation)
 Brena (surname)

References

surnames